Ayer Hitam may refer to:

Places
Air Itam, a suburb of George Town in Penang
Ayer Hitam, a town in Batu Pahat District, Johor
Ayer Hitam Mukim, a mukim in Muar District, Johor

Constituencies
Ayer Hitam (federal constituency), represented in the Dewan Rakyat
Air Itam (Penang state constituency), represented in the Penang State Legislative Assembly (since 1995)
Ayer Itam (Penang state constituency), formerly represented in the Penang State Legislative Assembly (1959–95)
Ayer Hitam (Kedah state constituency), formerly represented in the Kedah State Legislative Assembly (since 1995)
Ayer Hitam (Johor state constituency), formerly represented in the Johor State Legislative Assembly (1959–74), see List of Malaysian State Assembly Representatives (1969–74)